Charles Hamilton Sanford (May 28, 1873 - February 16, 1942) was born in Cleveland, Ohio, and was president of the Syracuse Trust Company and co-founder of Sanford-Herbert Motor Truck Company in Syracuse, New York.

References 

Businesspeople from Syracuse, New York
Businesspeople from Cleveland
Burials at Oakwood Cemetery (Syracuse, New York)
1873 births
1942 deaths